Thulsa Doom is a Norwegian heavy metal band. It takes its name from the Robert E. Howard character. This is not to be mistaken for the New York crust punk band with the same name that existed from 1998–2000.

History
The band was formed in 1999 by guitarist Ole Petter Andreassen (also a member of The Cumshots and Black Debbath), under the stage name El Doom. He was joined by his Black Debbath colleague, bass player Egil Hegerberg, using the name Angelov Doom, as well as singer Papa Doom, guitarist Doom Perignon and drummer Fast Winston Doom.	 
			
The band's music is somewhat similar to stoner rock legends Kyuss and early Black Sabbath. The band's debut release She Fucks Me was released in 2000. The five-track EP has a picture of Bill Clinton on the cover. Thulsa Doom have since released three full-length albums. One of their trademarks is very long and strange album titles.	 
		 
Singer Papa Doom left the band in 2003, and guitarist Doom Perignon is now the band's singer. The band's latest album Keyboard, Oh Lord! Why Don't We? is a bit less heavy and more melodic than the previous albums. Their cover version of Beach Boys' "Tears in the Morning" was a minor TV hit in Norway in the summer of 2005 with a video directed by Jarle Medhus.

Members
 Papa Doom (Jacob Krogvold) – lead vocals (1999–2003 2013–)
 Doom Perignon (Henning Solvang) – guitar, lead vocals since 2003	
 El Doom (Ole Petter Andreassen) – guitar, vocals	
 Angelov Doom (Egil Hegerberg) – bass, keyboards, vocals	
 Fast Winston Doom (Halvor Winsnes) – drums

Discography

Albums
The Seats are Soft But the Helmet Is Way Too Tight (2001)
...And Then Take You to a Place Where Jars are Kept (2003)
Keyboard, Oh Lord! Why Don't We? (2005)
A Keen Eye for the Obvious (2017)

EPs
She Fucks Me (EP) (2000)

Singles
City of people / Sleep with celebrity (2001)

External links
 Official site

Norwegian stoner rock musical groups
Norwegian heavy metal musical groups
Norwegian hard rock musical groups
Norwegian doom metal musical groups
Norwegian rock music groups
Musical groups established in 1999
1999 establishments in Norway
Musical groups disestablished in 2006
2006 disestablishments in Norway
Musical groups from Oslo